Saint Lucia competed at the 2015 Pan American Games in Toronto, Canada from July 10 to 26, 2015.

Swimmer Jordan Augier was the flagbearer for the team during the opening ceremony.

High jumper Levern Spencer won St. Lucia's first ever Pan American Games gold medal.

Competitors
The following table lists Saint Lucia's delegation per sport and gender.

Medalists
The following competitors from Saint Lucia won medals at the games. In the by discipline sections below, medalists' names are bolded.

|style="text-align:left; width:78%; vertical-align:top;"|

|style="text-align:left; width:22%; vertical-align:top;"|

Athletics

Saint Lucia qualified two female athletes.

Women
Field events

Beach volleyball

Saint Lucia qualified a men's pair.

Sailing

Saint Lucia qualified one sailor.

Swimming

Saint Lucia qualified one male swimmer.

See also
Saint Lucia at the 2016 Summer Olympics

References

Nations at the 2015 Pan American Games
Pan
2015